Katarzyna Donalska is a Polish coloratura soprano.

Dondalska was born in Bydgoszcz to a family of professional musicians. She started playing violin at the age of 5.

In 2004, she made her US debut playing the Queen of the Night in The Magic Flute at Houston Grand Opera.

In 2015, she received habilitated doctor degree in musical arts, and has since been associate professor at the Art Academy of Szczecin.

References

External links 

 
 Katarzyna Dondalska at Operabase
 Katarzyna Dondalska at Lombardo Associates
 Katarzyna Dondalska at Akademia Sztuki w Szczecinie

Year of birth missing (living people)
Living people
Musicians from Bydgoszcz
Polish operatic sopranos
20th-century Polish women opera singers
21st-century Polish women opera singers